Oncopagurus, is a genus of marine hermit crabs in the family Parapaguridae, which contains 25 species. Members of this genus live from 40 to 2,308 meters below the surface.

Species

 Oncopagurus africanus (de Saint Laurent, 1972)
 Oncopagurus bicristatus (A. Milne-Edwards, 1880)
 Oncopagurus bifidus Lemaitre, 2014
 Oncopagurus brevis Lemaitre, 2014
 Oncopagurus cidaris Lemaitre, 1996
 Oncopagurus conicus Lemaitre, 2006
 Oncopagurus crusoei Lemaitre, 2014
 Oncopagurus curvispina (de Saint Laurent, 1974)
 Oncopagurus elevatus Lemaitre, 2014
 Oncopagurus elongatus Lemaitre, 2014
 Oncopagurus glebosus Lemaitre, 1997
 Oncopagurus gracilis (Henderson, 1888)
 Oncopagurus haigae (de Saint Laurent, 1972)
 Oncopagurus indicus (Alcock, 1905)
 Oncopagurus minutus (Henderson, 1896)
 Oncopagurus mironovi Zhadan, 1997
 Oncopagurus monstrosus (Alcock, 1894)
 Oncopagurus oimos Lemaitre, 1998
 Oncopagurus orientalis (de Saint Laurent, 1972)
 Oncopagurus petilus Lemaitre, 2014
 Oncopagurus pollicis Lemaitre, 2014
 Oncopagurus rossanae Lemaitre, 2014
 Oncopagurus spiniartus Lemaitre, 2014
 Oncopagurus stockmani Zhadan, 1997
 Oncopagurus tuamotu (Lemaitre, 1994)

References

Decapod genera